UEFA U-17 Championship 2009 (Elite Round) is the second round of qualifications for the final tournament of UEFA U-17 Championship 2009. The winners of each group join hosts  at the final tournament.

The Elite round has been played during March 1–31, 2009. The 28 teams advancing from the qualifying round have been distributed into seven groups of four teams, with each group being contested in the same format as in the previous round. The seven group-winning teams will qualify for the final tournament in Germany.

The draw was conducted on December 4, 2008, at UEFA's headquarters, in Nyon, Switzerland. Each team was previously allocated to one of four drawing pots, according to their qualifying round results. The seven sides with the best record were present in Pot A, and so forth until Pot D, which contained the seven teams with the weakest record. 
During the draw, each group was filled with one team from every pot, meaning that no team from the same pot could be drawn together. In the same way, teams having faced in the previous round could not be drawn together.

The hosts of the seven one-venue mini-tournament groups are indicated below in italics.

Group 1

Group 2

Group 3

Group 4

Group 5

Group 6

Group 7

References

External links 
 – uefa.com

Qualification
UEFA European Under-17 Championship qualification